The Assistant Secretary of the Navy (Financial Management and Comptroller) (abbreviated ASN FM) is a civilian office of the United States Department of the Navy.  The Assistant Secretary of the Navy (Financial Management and Comptroller) is responsible for managing and directing all of the financial matters, including the annual budgets, of the United States Navy and the United States Marine Corps.  The Assistant Secretary of the Navy (Financial Management and Comptroller) is also the Comptroller of the Department of the Navy.  The Assistant Secretary of the Navy (Financial Management and Comptroller) reports to the Under Secretary of the Navy.

The office was established in 1954; disestablished in 1958; and then re-established in 1961.  In June 1981, the office was re-designated as Deputy Under Secretary of the Navy (Financial Management and Comptroller), but in March 1984, the name switched back to Assistant Secretary of the Navy (Financial Management and Comptroller).

The Senior Official Performing the Duties of Assistant Secretary is Alaleh Jenkins as of January 20, 2021.

Assistant Secretaries of the Navy (Financial Management and Comptroller), 1954—present

Notes

External links
 Navy Library Profile of the Office
 Website of the Assistant Secretaries of the Navy (Financial Management)

Office of the Secretary of the Navy